Sergio Salvati (born 16 June 1938) is an Italian cinematographer who was born in Trastevere, a working-class neighborhood of Rome, Italy. His father, Aldofo Salvati, was already a key grip in the early days of Italian cinema, and through his father's contacts Sergio began his career developing negatives in a small photographic laboratory in Rome, the SPES directed by Di Ettore Catalucci.

Biography

In 1956 his father was working with Enzo Serafin, who asked Sergio to work with him as camera assistant on Raw Wind in Eden starring Esther Williams and Jeff Chandler. Many other films shot in Italy would follow, both cult classics and commercial cinema. He would be a camera assistant on Sergio Leone's The Good, the Bad, and the Ugly (1966) and later assistant to Ennio Guarnieri on three projects from the 60s and 70s: Pier Paolo Pasolini's Medea (1969), L'Invasion (1970) directed by Yves Allegret and Mauro Bolognini's Metello (1979).

During his career, Salvati would be director of photography for eleven films directed by Lucio Fulci, the Italian master of gore, including the famous Wax Mask taken over by Dario Argento when Fulci died during preparation of the film. He would also be cinematographer on several films produced by Charles Band, including Puppetmaster (1989). After having filmed scenes of Christian De Sica's remake of his father's film, Il Conte Max (1991), in Marrakech, Sergio Salvati established the groundwork for a collaboration with the country of Morocco that continues until today. He worked alongside his friend Ennio Guarnieri on two films from the TNT Bible series shot in Ouarzazate, the Hollywood of Morocco: Jacob (1994) and The Seventh Scroll (1999). At the age of 73, he was director of photography on an independent Moroccan film, The Return of the Son, directed by Ahmed Boulane.

He has taught and continues to teach cinematography in film schools in both Ouarzazate and Casablanca. He has taught at the famous Centro Sperimentale Di Cinematografia in Rome and freely shares his experience with young filmmakers, as well as perpetuating the rich tradition of "Italian cinema". Salvati was president of the AIC, Associazione Italiana Autori della Fotografia, from 2007 through 2008 and remains on the board of directors.

Partial filmography
Note: The films listed as N/A are not necessarily chronological.

References

Footnotes

Sources

External links
 

1938 births
Italian cinematographers
Living people
Film people from Rome
Academic staff of the Centro Sperimentale di Cinematografia